Kovacsia is a genus of air-breathing land snails, terrestrial pulmonate gastropod mollusks in the family Hygromiidae, the hairy snails and their allies.

Species
Species within the genus Kovacsia include:
 Kovacsia kovacsi (Varga & L. Pintér, 1972)

References

 Nordsieck, H. (1993). Das System der paläarktischen Hygromiidae (Gastropoda: Stylommatophora: Helicoidea). Archiv für Molluskenkunde, 122 (Zilch-Festschrift): 1-23. Frankfurt am Main
 Bank, R. A. (2017). Classification of the Recent terrestrial Gastropoda of the World. Last update: July 16th, 2017

External links
 

 
Gastropod genera